Alphabeat may refer to:

Alphabeat, Danish band
Alphabeat (album), self-titled album by Alphabeat
"The Alphabeat" (song), song by David Guetta